Thalaivan is a 1970 Indian Tamil-language thriller film, directed by P. A. Thomas. The film stars M. G. Ramachandran and Vanisree, while M. N. Nambiar and S. A. Ashokan portray the antagonists.

Plot 

The story begins at the time of the end of the reign of the last kings of India in our days (the 1970s).

Sanguili (M. N. Nambiar) is a man without faith nor law, who extorts, kidnaps, if necessary, which murders and desires for a very long time, the fabulous treasure of the king of neighborhood, (S. V. Ramadoss).

At the time of seizing it, where he fails moreover, he kills the king and puts the blame of this heinous crime on his wife, the queen, then pregnant.

All the indications accuse the poor queen, who eventually volatilizes.

The only one, Velamma (G. Sakunthala), who could acquit her, is silenced by the threats of Sanguili. Some years passed.

Ilango (MGR), a particularly very effective secret agent (grace, among others, in its total control of the yoga and to his knowledge complete of the well done of healing plants, inherited from his father, Moghan Ram (K. Nadarajan (or) K. Nadaraja Iyer), an herbalist of great renown) is sent by his superiors with a mission to stop the actions of Sanguili.

A map is in the center of this case, because it indicates the location exact of the famous treasure, so looked for, for years by Sanguili.

Cast 

The casting is established according to the original order of the credits of opening of the movie, except those not mentioned.

Production 
The film faced numerous production troubles for over 18 months, including financial and call sheet issues.

Soundtrack 
The music was composed by S. M. Subbaiah Naidu, while the lyrics were written by Vaali. In his memoir, Vaali wrote that Ramachandran told him, "Unlike for other movies, I had given the most number of call sheets for this movie. More than 18 months had passed: finance problem, call sheet problem, and also a particular lyric you had written when it was recorded on the first day of ‘pooja’ shooting, that turned out to be a bad omen. Vaali, the movie's title is Thalaivan (i.e., leader). You had written a line that Thalaivan hasn't come yet".

References

External links 
 

1970 films
1970s Tamil-language films